Rowen Shepherd (born 25 December 1970, Edinburgh, Scotland) is a former Scottish international rugby union player, who played for . He was capped twenty times for Scotland between 1995 and 1998.

References

1970 births
Living people
Scottish rugby union players
Scotland international rugby union players
Rugby union players from Edinburgh
Caledonia Reds players
Glasgow Warriors players
North and Midlands players
Rugby union fullbacks